Lastur is a neighborhood of Deba, Gipuzkoa, Spain.

References

Towns in Spain
Populated places in Gipuzkoa